Donald Grady (born 11 June 1951) is a Canadian former ski jumper who competed in the 1976 Winter Olympics.

References

1951 births
Living people
Canadian male ski jumpers
Olympic ski jumpers of Canada
Ski jumpers at the 1976 Winter Olympics
Place of birth missing (living people)